The 1999 Le Mans Fuji 1000 km was an endurance race backed by the Automobile Club de l'Ouest (ACO), who ran the 24 Hours of Le Mans, and the Japan Automobile Federation (JAF), who ran the JGTC race series. It was run on November 7, 1999.

Pre-race
Since the mid-1990s, a large number of Japanese automobile manufacturers had begun to compete at the 24 Hours of Le Mans, including Honda, Toyota, and Nissan.  Japanese constructors and engine builders were also competing as well, such as Dome, Tom's, and Mugen Motorsports.  The ACO therefore was interested in the idea of creating a new sportscar series in Japan similar to the one that had recently been created in the United States, the American Le Mans Series.  Thus, the Fuji 1000 km would serve as a one-off experiment to see how well a series would perform in Japan in the future, similar to the one-off 1998 Petit Le Mans for the ALMS.

With an agreement between the ACO and JAF, the race was agreed to take place at Fuji Speedway, and to combine the ACO's LMP, LMGTP, GTS, and GT class with the JAF's JGTC series GT500 and GT300 classes.  The addition of JGTC machinery was done not only to entice Japanese teams into possibly moving into the ACO's sportscars, but also to help fill the field and to bring a crowd.  However, the race did not count as part of the JGTC season, thus a full JGTC field was not expected since the race was optional.  For the ACO classes, an incentive to bring competitors not only from Japan but also internationally was added in that, like Petit Le Mans, the winners in each class would earn automatic entry to the 2000 24 Hours of Le Mans.

Official results
Class winners in bold.  Cars failing to complete 70% of winner's distance marked as Not Classified (NC).

Statistics
 Pole Position – #1 Toyota Motorsport – 1:16.349
 Fastest Lap – #1 Toyota Motorsport – 1:18.806
 Average Speed – 180.792 km/h

Post-race
Although the race was very competitive for Japanese manufacturer's Nissan and Toyota, the event was not considered a major success.  Only twenty three entrants showed in total, with just sixteen being in the ACO's classes.  Although Nissan and Toyota both had more cars they could have entered, each chose only to compete with a single car.  A large number of European teams which had been on the entry list also failed to show up, most notably BMW Motorsport with their V12 LMR prototypes.

Toyota and Nissan had both decided to abandon their sportscar efforts after 1999, meaning neither team took their automatic entries for Le Mans in 2000.  European interest in the series was also lacking, especially since teams like BMW and Audi seemed more interested in competing in the American Le Mans Series.  This left the proposed series with no major manufacturer involvement to help bring in fans as well as other competition.

Consideration for a Japanese series was revived once again in late 2000 when Don Panoz and the International Motor Sports Association (IMSA) announced their intentions to expand upon their American Le Mans Series, a series endorsed by the ACO.  Panoz would plan an Asian-Pacific Le Mans Series (APLMS), competing throughout the entire Pacific rim.  An exhibition event was held in Australia at the end of 2000 with mixed success, with another event played for Malaysia in 2001.  However Panoz's other expansion outside the United States, the European Le Mans Series, would suffer from small fields and lack of competition throughout 2001.  With a continued lack of interest from major manufacturers in teams in the ELMS as well as the APLMS, both series would be cancelled.

In 2006, the ACO was finally able to create a new sports car series in Japan with the launch of the Japan Le Mans Challenge. However, the series suffered from poor number of entries and was replaced by Asian Le Mans Series in 2009, but that series did not run another race again until 2013, by which time Toyota had returned to Le Mans with the TS030 Hybrid.

See also
Fuji Grand Champion Series
Fuji Long Distance Series
Japan Le Mans Challenge

References

External links 
 Le Mans Fuji 1000 Kilometers Results

Le Mans Fuji
6 Hours of Fuji